GCAA or Ghana Civil Aviation Authority is the civil aviation authority and regulatory agency of the Republic of Ghana for air transportation in the country. It has its headquarters in Kotoka Airport in Accra.

It also provides air navigation services within the Accra Flight Information Region (FIR), which comprises the airspace over the Republic of Ghana and a large area over the Atlantic Ocean in the Gulf of Guinea. Togo and Benin took over their Airspace in 2015.

History
The GCAA was established in 1930 as a unit with Public Works Department (PWD); in 1953 GCAA was granted Departmental Status. It became an Authority under PNDC Law 151 from 16 May 1986. In 2004, the GCAA Act was enacted to replace PNDC Law 151.

The Civil Aviation Act, Act 678 of November 2004 provides for the establishment of a Civil Aviation Authority, which will focus on the core functions of airspace management and safety regulations whilst allowing for a different organization to handle airport development and operations.

Pursuant to the above, the GCAA was restructured into two bodies, that is, the new Ghana Civil Aviation Authority (GCAA) and the Ghana Airports Company Limited (GACL) on 1 January 2007.

Functions of GCAA Under 678
Under the GCAA Act 678, the functions of GCAA include the following:
 Licensing and Certification of Air Transport Operators.
 Licensing and Certification of Aerodromes and the Construction, Operation, Maintenance and Managements of Navigation Sites.
 Provision of Air Navigation Services (Air Space Management) within the Accra Flight Information Region (FIR).
 Regulation of Air Transport Services.
 Promoting the Development of Civil Air Transport Industry in Ghana.
 Advising Government on all matters Concerning Civil Aviation, among other functions.
 Provision of oversight for all activities related to civil aviation.

(Source: GCAA www.gcaa.com.gh)

References

External links

 Ghana Civil Aviation Authority

Ghana
Government agencies established in 1930
Government of Ghana
Civil aviation in Ghana
Transport organisations based in Ghana